Abhimanyu Samanta Singhara (23 February 1760 – 15 Jun 1806) was an 18th-century Odia poet born in Balia, Jajpur best known as the writer of the iconic Bidagdha Chintamani kabya. Abhimanyu was one of the important musician-poets in the tradition of Odissi music in the 18th century, composing mainly in the Chhānda style. He has also written many Odia folk songs like Bagha Gita (tiger song), Chadhei Gita (bird song). He has written many poems about the love between Radha and Krishna.

Life
He was born in Balia village, Jajpur on 23 February 1760. Balia village is situated near famous Buddhist place Ratnagiri Mahavihara of Jajpur. His father Indrajita Samanta Singhara had no child. But it is said that Abhimanyu was born due to the worship of a saint, Sadananda Kabisujrya Brahma. He was the teacher of Abhimanyu. He had written his first poem at the age of 9.

Abhimanyu employs several dozen ragas in his range of works, employing both well-known and rarer ancient ragas of the Odissi music tradition. In his magnum opus Bidagdha Chintamani, he uses several ragas for the 98 chhānda songs, such as Chakrakeli, Chokhi, Chinta Kamodi, Bangalasri, Dhanasri, Rasakulya, Sankarabharana, Kalyana Ahari, Kumbha Kamodi, Bibhasa, Kedara Kamodi, Ahari, Bhairaba, Gouri, Ramakeri, Kali, Ghantaraba, Kalyana, Kanada, Kamodi, Baradi, Malaba, Sindhuda, Kedara Gouda, Saranga, Purbi, Ranabije, Lalita Kamodi, Chalaghanta, Kedara, Rasa Kedara, Soka Kamodi, Jayanta Kala, Bichitra Desakhya, Pahadia Kedara, Patamanjari, Malasri, Dhipa, Bhupala, Asabari, Lalita Kedara, Gujjari, Mukhari, Panchama Baradi, Nalinigouda, Kalahansa Kamodi, Mangala, etc. Following the ancient music of Odisha, Abhimanyu particularly excels in the usage of jugma-ragas, complex ragas formed by the union of two or more ragas, such as Pahadia Kedara, Kalyana Ahari, Bibhasa Kedara, etc.

Literary works 

 Bidagdha Chintamani
 Prema (Preeti) Chintamani
 Prema Kala
 Rasabati
 Sulakhyana
 Prema Tarangini
 Bagha Gita
 Chadhei Gita
 Bole Hun

References

External references
 History of Odia literature, Mayadhar Manasingh, Publisher: Grantha Mandira 
 Prachina Odia Kabita Sambhara, Editor: Jatindra Mohan Mohanty, Publisher: Subarnarekha, Bhubaneswar
 Utkala Lakshmi, Gangadhar Granthabali(Odia), Das Brothers, Cuttack-Berhampur- Sambalpur, 3rd reprint, 1961
 Fakirmohan Senapatinka Atmacharita (Odia), Edited by Debendra Kumar Dash, National Book Trust, New Delhi, Reprint, 2015, pp-58

1760 births
1806 deaths
Poets from Odisha
People from Jajpur district
Indian male poets
Odia-language poets
Odissi music composers
18th-century Indian poets
19th-century Indian poets